The 1923 Ohio State Buckeyes football team represented Ohio State University in the 1923 Big Ten Conference football season. The Buckeyes compiled a 3–4–1 record, but outscored opponents 124–99.

Schedule

Coaching staff
 John Wilce, head coach, 11th year

References

Ohio State
Ohio State Buckeyes football seasons
Ohio State Buckeyes football